Cartí Sugtupu is an island in the San Blas Archipelago in the Guna Yala province of Panama. It is the southernmost and largest of four populated Carti Islands (the others are Cartí Tupile in the north, Yandup or Narganá in the west, and Muladub in the east), and it lies 1200 meters off the northern coast of mainland Panama. The island is densely populated and houses a small harbour and a museum. 

Cartí Sugtupu can be reached by boat from the nearby onshore settlement of Carti and the Cartí Airport, which both are connected to the main Panamanian road network. The other island groups of San Blas archipelago, including El Porvenir, Cayos Limones, and Cayos Holandeses, can be reached by taxiboat.

The island's population is in the process of relocating to the mainland of Panama due to sea level rise, although as of 2017 this move is on hold until funding for the construction of housing and completion of public amenities is obtained.

References 

Populated places in Guna Yala
Caribbean islands of Panama